The Nikon S3 is a professional level, interchangeable lens, 35 mm film, rangefinder camera introduced in 1958. It was manufactured by the Japanese optics company Nippon Kogaku K. K. (Nikon Corporation since 1988).

The S3 is mechanically similar to the Nikon SP except for a simplified viewfinder system. The viewfinder does not compensate for parallax error and the framelines are fixed (etched).

In 2000, Nikon introduced an updated, hand-assembled S3 model to celebrate the new millennium. It was quite a production to produce S3s again, as all the original dies were long gone. The new Nikkor 50mm 1.4 lens for the new S3 is noticeably larger than original 50mm 1.4 lenses.

Specifications
 Shutter 	 = Horizontal running rubber coated fabric curtain type focal plane shutter
 Shutter speeds = T, B and 1, 1/2, 1/4, 1/8, 1/15, 1/30, 1/60, 1/125, 1/250, 1/500 and 1/1000 seconds (regular interval graduation)
 Range marker 	 = M inscription (XXINF - 0.9)
 Self-timer 	 = Connect time variable system (the graduation of 3, 6 and 10 seconds it is attached)
 Pc socket 	 = Time lag variable system, it aligns the synchronizer socket attachment and the speed light/write in 1/60 seconds less than
 Finder 	 = Rangefinder type fixed 1x magnification finder (wide angle finder for 28mm and 35mm finder)
 Framelines     = 35mm, 50mm, 105mm
 Film wind      = Hand operated lever system, 136 degree revolution (multiple winds possible), with 15 degree extra withdrawal angles
 Film rewind 	 = Manual Crank system
 Film           = 135 Film (35mm film) with 36x24mm image size

See also
Nikon
Nikon I, M and S
Nikon SP
Nikon S4

References

External links

 Nikon S3 Millennium Model, by Nikon
 Nikon Rangefinder Cameras, by Nikon
 Nikon S3
 Photoethnography Nikon S3

S
S